Donald Ernest Friedman (May 4, 1935 – June 30, 2016) was an American jazz pianist. He began playing in Los Angeles and moved to New York in 1958. In the 1960s, he played with both modern stylists and more traditional musicians.

Early life
Friedman was born on May 4, 1935, in San Francisco. Both of his parents immigranted to the United States: his father, Edward Friedman, was from Lithuania, and his mother, Alma Loew, was from Germany. He began playing the piano at the age of four, switching from classical music to jazz after his family moved to Los Angeles when he was fifteen. His early jazz piano influence was Bud Powell. Friedman briefly studied composition at Los Angeles City College.

Later life and career
On the West Coast, Friedman performed with Dexter Gordon, Chet Baker, Buddy DeFranco, and Ornette Coleman. He was also a member of Clark Terry's big band.

Friedman moved to New York permanently in 1958. In the 1960s, Friedman played with both modern jazz and more traditionally orientated musicians. The former included Coleman, Eric Dolphy, Jimmy Giuffre, Booker Little, and Attila Zoller; the latter included Bobby Hackett and Herbie Mann. Friedman's first album as a leader was A Day in the City, in 1961. Some of his early albums received top ratings from DownBeat, which also gave him its critics' poll New Star award. He was also an educator in New York. He had many fans in Japan.

Friedman married three times; the first two ended in divorce. He died of pancreatic cancer, at home in the Bronx on June 30, 2016. Survivors were one daughter, actress/writer, Lynn Adrianna Freedman, and a granddaughter.

Discography

As leader/co-leader

As sideman 

With Buddy Collette
 Nice Day with Buddy Collette (Contemporary, 1957) – recorded in 1956–57

With Herb Geller
 At The Movies (Hep Jazz, 2007)

With Lee Konitz
 Lee Konitz Meets Don Friedman (InsightAttila Zollers, 1994) – recorded in 1992
 Thingin' (HatART, 1996) – live recorded in 1995. also with Attila Zoller.

With Hank De Mano
 Listen to The Hank De Mano Quartet (Freeway Jazz, 1956)

With John Handy
 No Coast Jazz (Roulette, 1960)

With Joe Henderson
 Tetragon (Milestone, 1968) – recorded in 1967-68

With Elvin Jones
 And Then Again (Atlantic, 1965)

With Don Lanphere
 Into Somewhere (Hep, 1983)

With Booker Little
 Out Front (Candid, 1961)
 Booker Little and Friend (Bethlehem, 1961)

With Charles Lloyd
 Discovery! (Columbia, 1964)

With Herbie Mann
 Herbie Mann Live at Newport (Atlantic, 1963)
 My Kinda Groove (Atlantic, 1965) – recorded in 1964
 Our Mann Flute (Atlantic, 1966) – recorded in 1960-66
 The Beat Goes On (Atlantic, 1967) – recorded in 1964-67

With Eiji Nakayama
 Conversation (Art Union, 1986)
 Sweet View: Eiji Nakayama Don Friedman Live in Japan (Jazz Road, 1987)
 Legend of the Lake (Jazz Road, 1988)

With Dave Pike
 Manhattan Latin (Decca, 1964)
 The Doors of Perception (Vortex, 1970) – recorded in 1966

With Sal Salvador Quintet
 In Our Own Sweet Way (Stash, 1983)

With Yuko Shigeno
 Shiny Stockings (Space Shower Music, 2011)
 Circle Waltz with Don Friedman (24 Jazz Japan, 2013)

With Hiromi Shimizu
 Waltz Tenderly (Jazz on Top, 2008)
 Live at Jazz on Top (Jazz on Top, 2010) – live

With Grady Tate
 She Is My Lady (Janus, 1972)

With Clark Terry
 It's What's Happenin' (Impulse!, 1967)
 In Concert: Live (Etoile, 1973) – live recorded in 1970
 Portraits (Chesky, 1989) – recorded in 1988
 Live on QE2 (Chiaroscuro, 2001) – live recorded in 1999

With Attila Zoller
 The Horizon Beyond (EmArcy, 1965)

References

External links
Don Friedman discography at JazzDiscography.com
Don Friedman Jazz Pianist! at DonFriedman.net

1935 births
2016 deaths
American jazz pianists
American male pianists
Los Angeles City College alumni
Jazz musicians from San Francisco
American jazz composers
American male jazz composers
American jazz bandleaders
American music educators
Swing pianists
Free jazz musicians
Riverside Records artists
Educators from California
Pianists from San Francisco